Manuel A. Alculete Lopes de Araújo (born 11 October 1970) is a Mozambican politician who has been Mayor of Quelimane since December 2011.

References

1970 births
Living people
Members of the Assembly of the Republic (Mozambique)
Democratic Movement of Mozambique politicians
RENAMO politicians